Super One is the first studio album by South Korean supergroup SuperM. It was released on September 25, 2020 by SM Entertainment, Capitol Records and Dreamus. The album was preceded by the singles "With You", "100" and "Tiger Inside" and was released alongside the lead single, "One (Monster & Infinity)". The physical edition of the album comes in five versions: two group and three unit versions. The Asia ver. was released on October 26, 2020.

Background and release 
Following up promotions for the group's self-titled debut EP, SuperM performed an unreleased song titled "Dangerous Woman" on their concert tour SuperM: We Are the Future Live and during their appearance on The Jimmy Kimmel Show on February 11, 2020. SuperM participated in the Global Citizen event One World: Together at Home on April 18, 2020, during which they performed another new song titled "With You". The song was included in the concert playlist album that was released exclusively for streaming on Spotify on April 19, 2020.

On August 5, 2020, SM Entertainment announced that the group would make their comeback with two digital singles and their first studio album. The album's first single, "100", was released on August 14, 2020. Its follow-up, "Tiger Inside", was released on September 1, 2020. Super One was released on September 25, 2020, along with the music video for the lead single, "One (Monster & Infinity)".

Composition 
The album opens with "One (Monster & Infinity)", a so-called "hybrid remix", which is a combination of two different songs. With lyrics full of confidence and the will of overcoming the hardships in front of them without fear, the song showcases SuperM's intense and energetic performance. The second track "Infinity" is described as a song with a grand introduction which begins with a magnificent brass orchestration. The highlight of the song is the immersive introduction from the speedy rapping of members Mark and Taeyong, and the chorus that conveys the ambition of "to go to infinity" with energetic vocals. The album continues with "Monster", a song with an intense energy of distorted percussive bass riffs with a motive reminiscent of a "monster", thus fitting the title of the song. The fourth track "Wish You Were Here" is a song with an addictive chorus melody on top of the reggae rhythm and dub sound. Its lyrics express the feelings of a lover's sorrow caused by being unable to be together due to unavoidable circumstances. "Big Chance", the fifth track of the album, is described as a tropical house song, which conveys the sincere feelings of young people toward their loves ones, saying, "a big mistake we make can be a big opportunity". The next track, "100", is characterized as a song with a fast base line and dynamic rhythms that expresses SuperM's unique and powerful energy. The song was co-written and co-produced by member Mark. The seventh track "Tiger Inside" is the conceptual extension to "I Can’t Stand The Rain". It features traditional Asian elements and futuristic electronic beats.

The next half of Super One starts with "Better Days", a song with the message of warm comfort and empathy from SuperM in the current difficult situationexpressed through flexible rap flows and warm vocals, led by a vintage upright piano and contrabass. Vocal group Heritage participated as choir. The ninth track "Together At Home" is described as an R&B disco song driven by a funky bass line, with lyrics that create a good time uniting one another in a new way, not a physical space. The next track, "Drip", is a trendy "ratchet" trap hip-hop genre with a sexy and provocative atmosphere. The lyrics are a visual depiction gradually depicting the increasing tension of the opposite sex. The tenth track "Line 'Em Up" is a rhythmic pop-dance song that is uniquely translated by interpreting reggaeton in the style of SuperM. It expresses the ambition to capture the hearts of fans around the world and make them feel "one". "Dangerous Woman", the eleventh track of the album", again a trap hip-hop song, has an "impressive" reversal from the rich harmonies and ad-lip intro acappella to a completely different atmosphere. Its lyrics convey the feelings of a man who fell in love with a woman with the fatal charms of both extremes. It is followed by "Step Up" is a song with witty lyrics that express one's desire to take one step further. The fourteenth track "So Long" is a slow jam number that describes the feelings of a man who claims to be a villain by informing about a heartbreaking breakup for the other person. The final track "With You" is described as an up-tempo electropop song that stands out with a rhythmic cut-out guitar. The lyrics express the desire of wanting to be with your loved ones are also directed to the fans, and are characterized by an easy melody that can be enjoyed with the fans in performances.

Reception 
Super One received generally positive reviews from critics. Tamar Herman from The Recording Academy opined that the album, which came out during the global COVID-19 pandemic, "spends its length motivating listeners through a freewheeling medley of energetic, vibrant electro-pop anthems and mellowing out to offer up lackadaisical, breezy moments on hopeful tracks". Vandana Pawa from Teen Vogue described Super One as "a monster of a debut full-length album that takes a jaunt through a new era of music and brings the group to the next level".

Commercial performance 
Super One debuted at number two on the US Billboard 200 with 104,000 album-equivalent units (of which 101,000 were in album sales), becoming the group's second top three entry on the chart.<ref>{{Cite magazine|title=Machine Gun Kelly Earns First No. 1 Album on Billboard 200 Chart With 'Tickets to My Downfall|url=https://www.billboard.com/articles/business/chart-beat/9460063/machine-gun-kelly-tickets-to-my-downfall-number-one-billboard-200|access-date=2020-10-11|magazine=Billboard|language=en}}</ref> Additionally, the album earned the top spot on the Billboard World Albums Chart, making it the group second chart-topper after their debut EP SuperM. SuperM also achieved their first number one on the Billboard Independent Albums Chart.

In Japan, SuperM claimed the number one spot in five major charts on Line Music. Shortly after its release, Super One'' topped the realtime/daily Line Music Album Chart. The title song "One (Monster & Infinity)" also topped the realtime/daily Line Music Song Chart as well as the daily Line Music K-Pop Chart. "One (Monster & Infinity)" earned the group's its third number one song on the Line Music chart this year, after "100" and "Tiger Inside".

Track listing

Personnel
Credits adapted from Tidal and Naver.

 Baekhyun – vocals 
 Taemin – vocals 
 Kai – vocals 
 Taeyong – vocals , lyricist 
 Ten – vocals 
 Lucas – vocals 
 Mark – vocals , lyricist , composer 
 Lee Soo-manproducer
 Kenzie – production , lyricist , composer , programming 
 Moonshine – production , programming 
 Adrian McKinnon – composer , lyricist 
 Wilbart "Vedo" McCoy III – composer , lyricist 
 Bobii Lewis – composer , lyricist 
 Jonatan Gusmark – composer 
 Ludvig Evers – composer 
 Lee Min-kyu – engineer , mixing 
 Jeong Yoo-ra – engineer 
 Kwon Nam-woo – mastering engineer 
 Jung Eui-seok – mixing 
 Kang Eun-ji – recording engineer 
 Lee Ji-hong – recording engineer , mixing 
 No Min-ji – recording engineer 
 Bram Inscore – production, composer, programming 
 Jake Torrey – production, composer 
 Sam Farrar – production, composer 
 Evan Magee – composer 
 Seo Hye-ri – lyricist 
 Mok Ji-min – lyricist 
 Ron – lyricist 
 Seo-ro – lyricist 
 Kwon Eugene – engineer 
 Jin Namkoong – mixing 
 Mich Hansen (Cutfather) – production, composer, programming 
 Daniel Davidsen (PhD) – production, composer, programming 
 Andrew James Bullimore – composer, lyricist 
 James Norton – composer, lyricist 
 Jeremy "Tay" Jasper – composer , lyricist 
 Peter Wallevik – composer 
 Harold "Alawn" Philippon – production, composer, programming 
 Andy Love – production, composer, lyricist, programming 

 Yoo Young-jin – production, composer, lyricist, mixing, programming 
 Ryan S. Jhun – composer 
 Jasmine Kara Khatib-Nia – composer 
 Cheon Hoon – mastering engineer 
 Alexander Magnus Karlsson – composer 
 Hwang Yoo-bin – lyricist 
 Min Sungsu – engineer 
 Andreas Öberg – production, composer, lyricist, programming 
 Christoffer Semelius – production, composer, lyricist, programming 
 Carl Lehmann – production, composer, programming 
 Samuel Preston – production, composer, programming 
 Sylvester Willy Sivertsen – production, composer, programming 
 Lee Seu-ran – lyricist 
 Jang Wooyoung – engineer 
 LDN Noise – production, programming 
 Greg Bonnick – composer 
 Hayden Chapman – composer 
 Kenyon Moore – composer 
 Jo Yoon-kyung – lyricist 
 Zachary Chicoine – composer 
 Kim Chul-soon – mixing 
 Daniel "Obi" Klein – production, composer, programming 
 Charli Taft – composer 
 Cheon Song-yi – lyricist 
 Jakob Mihoubi – composer 
 Rudi Daouk – composer 
 Danke – lyricist 
 Lee Hee-joo – composer 
 Jeffrey Twumasi – composer 
 Maegan Cottone – composer 
 Stephan Benson – composer 
 Park Wu-hyun – composer 
 On Seung-yun – engineer 
 Noday – composer 
 Alyssa Ichinose – production, composer 
 Carlyle Fernandes – production, composer, programming 
 Benjamin Roberts – production, composer, programming 
 Gaelen Whittemore – production, composer, programming 
 Jonny West – lyricist 
 Victor Manzano – production, composer, programming 
 Maxx Song – engineer

Charts

Weekly charts

Year-end charts

Certifications and sales figures

Release history

See also 
 List of K-pop albums on the Billboard charts
 List of K-pop songs on the Billboard charts

References

SuperM albums
2020 albums
Korean-language albums
SM Entertainment albums
Capitol Records albums
Caroline Records albums
IRiver albums
Albums produced by Lee Soo-man